Norah Patten is an Irish aeronautical engineer and an award winning STEM (Science, Technology, Engineering and Maths) advocate from Ballina, County Mayo.

Early life and education 
Patten was born in Ballina, County Mayo she went to secondary school in St. Marys Convent, and was fascinated by space as a child after visiting NASA when she was 11 years old. She never let go of that interest and passion for space; designing rockets for her junior certificate art project, visiting NASA on numerous occasions as a teenager, and strategically selecting to study Aeronautical Engineering at the University of Limerick. Patten completed a work placement at Boeing during her undergraduate degree program and continued her education at the University of Limerick, where she obtained her doctorate in Aerodynamics in 2011. She completed a work placement in Bell Labs during this time.

Patten participated European Space Agency supported Alpbach Summer School in 2008 and graduated from the International Space University Space Studies Program in 2010.

Career 
Patten worked as a lecturer and project manager at University of Limerick before joining the Irish Composites Centre as the Communications and Outreach Manager in 2012. Patten initiated and managed "The Only Way is Up" project, which sent Ireland’s first student experiment to the International Space Station in 2014, through a commercial agreement with NanoRacks.

She was awarded an International Astronautical Federation Emerging Space Leaders Grant and was a panellist on the Next Generation Plenary  in 2015 . Patten has been selected as department and team project Chair at the International Space University on numerous occasions and was elected as a member of the voluntary global faculty of the International Space University in 2016. Patten was the first Irish participant at Project PoSSUM and has completed high-g flights, hypoxia training, aviation egress training and spacesuit testing and evaluations.

Communication and Outreach 
Patten is a strong advocate for STEM (Science, Technology, Engineering and Maths). She is an experienced communicator and has appeared on several national television shows, including Virgin Media One Ireland AM and numerous radio programs, including Today FM. She regularly gives keynote speeches and works with Irish companies to promote STEM initiatives. Patten was among Limerick's Top 40 under 40 featured in Image (magazine) as part of the Changemakers series in 2018.

Patten created Planet Zebunar, a STEM product for children that is inclusive, non-gender specific and offers an immersive experience through the combination of offline and online technologies, namely augmented reality. Patten's mission is to develop a community of STEM enthusiasts and inspire the next generation of engineers, astronauts, scientists and innovators.

References 

Living people
Irish women engineers
Aeronautical engineers
Women space scientists
People from County Mayo
Year of birth missing (living people)